William Sugars McLemore (1830–1908) was a circuit judge for Tennessee and a colonel in the Confederate States Army during the American Civil War.

Origins 
William Sugars LcLemore was born ten miles south of Franklin, Williamson County, Tennessee, on February 1, 1830, son of A. J. and Bethenia S. (Dabney) McLemore, and was of Scotch-Irish extraction. His father was born in Williamson County in 1801, and died there in 1849. His mother was born in 1803 and died in 1857. Of thirteen children born, William Sugars was the fifth child and second son. He was reared on the farm and received his education in the common schools of the neighborhood in which he lived.

Early career 
At seventeen years of age McLemore entered the Transylvania University at Lexington, Kentucky, and in 1849 he entered Lebanon Law School, where he graduated in 1851. In the same year he began to practice in Franklin, and in 1856 he was elected county court clerk, and held this office until 1860, when he declined re-election and resumed the practice of law.

Civil War 
In 1861 he enlisted in Company F, 4th Tennessee Cavalry, Confederate States Army, and was promoted to first lieutenant on October 30 1861, captain at an unknown date, major in March 1863, and colonel on February 23, 1864. He led Dibrell's Cavalry Brigade at the Battle of Bentonville. He was accounted a brave and gallant soldier. In 1864, an examining board recommended him for promotion as "gallant and meritorious".  

According to the diary of his daughter Bethenia ("Thenie"), he was never wounded, although he had three horses shot from under him in the course of the war—once, at the Battle of Thompson's Station, the bullet passed through his canteen and was diverted by the water; his horse was shot through.

Later career 
In 1865 he returned home and immediately began the practice of law, which he continued until 1872 when he was elected criminal judge, the circuit then being composed of Williamson, Maury, Marshall and Giles Counties. He held this office for six years and in 1878 was elected circuit judge of the Ninth Judicial Circuit.

Personal life 
On May 15, 1856, he wedded Anna S. Wharton, daughter of W. H. Wharton, a medical doctor of Nashville. To Judge McLemore and wife were born five children: Annie L., Bethenia, Albert S., William W. and Lizzie M. He was formerly a Whig but after the Civil War was a thorough Democrat. He was a Mason and a member of the Methodist Episcopal Church South. His wife was a member of the Christian Church. He died in Murfreesboro on August 7, 1908, and was buried in Rest Haven Cemetery, Franklin.

See also 

 McLemore House

References

Sources 

 Allardice, Bruce S. (2008). Confederate Colonels: A Biographical Register. Columbia and London: University of Missouri Press. pp. 34, 268.
 Warwick, Richard, ed. (2001). "Records and Incidents of the Children of W.S. McLemore". Williamson County Historical Society Journal, no 32. pp. 55–94.

Attribution:

 Goodspeed, Westin Arthur, ed. (1886). History of Tennessee from the Earliest Time to the Present. Nashville, TN: The Goodspeed Publishing Co. pp. 996–997.

Further reading 

 Cotten, Michael (1994). The Williamson County Cavalry: A History of Company F, Fourth Tennessee Cavalry Regiment, CSA. [Goodlettsville, TN]: M. Cotten. 226 pages.
 Fleming, William Stuart (1876; repr. 1967). A Historical Sketch of Maury County: Read at the Centennial Celebration in Columbia, Tennessee, July 4th, 1876. Columbia, TN. p. 79.
 Guild, George B. (1913). A Brief Narrative of the Fourth Tennessee Cavalry Regiment, Wheeler's Corps, Army of Tennessee. Nashville, TN. pp. 19–20.
 Century Review, 1805–1905, Maury County, Tennessee. Columbia, TN. 1905. pp. 16–17.
 "Death of Prominent Lawyer and Soldier". Nashville Banner. August 8, 1908. p. 6.

External links 

 "Col William Sugars McLemore (1830-1908)". Find a Grave. Retrieved November 13, 2022.
 "William Sugars McLemore". Strong McLemore Ancestry. Retrieved November 13, 2022.

1830 births
1908 deaths
Confederate States Army officers
People from Franklin, Tennessee